Kim Simmone Geraldine Jacobs (born 5 September 1966) is a female retired British athlete who competed in the 100 metres and 200 metres. She represented Great Britain at four Olympic Games (1988–96), winning a bronze medal as a 17-year-old at the 1984 Los Angeles Olympics in the 4 x 100 metres relay. She also won a relay bronze medal at the 1990 European Championships and relay medals at three Commonwealth Games.

Career
Jacobs was born in Reading, Berkshire, England. She was a member of the Reading Athletic Club and later Shaftesbury Barnet Harriers. Her career best times are 11.31 secs for 100 metres (1988) and 22.95 for the 200 metres (1996). She won the AAA Championships 200 metres title in 1986, 1988 and 1996, and the UK Championship 200 metres title in 1997. A talented junior, she won three medals at the 1983 European Junior Championships and won an Olympic bronze medal aged 17, along with Heather Oakes, Kathy Cook and Bev Callender, with Jacobs replacing an injured Shirley Thomas in the British sprint relay squad at the 1984 Los Angeles Olympics. She also won sprint relay bronze at the 1990 European Championships; relay silver at the 1990 Commonwealth Games, and relay bronzes at the 1994 and 1998 Commonwealth Games. Her other individual results include finishing fourth in the 200 metres final at the 1986 Commonwealth Games in Edinburgh (just 0.02 from a medal), and seventh in the 100 metres final at the 1990 Commonwealth Games in Auckland.

International competitions

References

 

1966 births
Living people
British female sprinters
Olympic bronze medallists for Great Britain
Athletes (track and field) at the 1984 Summer Olympics
Athletes (track and field) at the 1988 Summer Olympics
Athletes (track and field) at the 1992 Summer Olympics
Athletes (track and field) at the 1996 Summer Olympics
Olympic athletes of Great Britain
Sportspeople from Reading, Berkshire
Commonwealth Games medallists in athletics
European Athletics Championships medalists
Athletes (track and field) at the 1986 Commonwealth Games
Athletes (track and field) at the 1990 Commonwealth Games
Athletes (track and field) at the 1994 Commonwealth Games
Athletes (track and field) at the 1998 Commonwealth Games
Commonwealth Games silver medallists for England
Commonwealth Games bronze medallists for England
English female sprinters
World Athletics Championships athletes for Great Britain
Medalists at the 1984 Summer Olympics
Olympic bronze medalists in athletics (track and field)
Olympic female sprinters
Medallists at the 1990 Commonwealth Games
Medallists at the 1994 Commonwealth Games
Medallists at the 1998 Commonwealth Games